Orlando Wellington is a Ghanaian football manager. He has previously managed the Ghana Under-20 team as the head coach.

He has also previously managed Heart of Lions in the Ghanaian Premier League.

References

Living people
Year of birth missing (living people)
Ghanaian football managers